John Forster (born 18 June 1948) is a former Australian rules footballer who played with Melbourne in the Victorian Football League (VFL).

Notes

External links 

		

1948 births
Australian rules footballers from Tasmania
Melbourne Football Club players
Living people